Tilman Eugene "Tripp" Self III (born November 25, 1968) is a United States district judge of the  United States District Court for the Middle District of Georgia and a former Judge of the Georgia Court of Appeals.

Education and career 

Born on November 25, 1968, Self received a Bachelor of Science in Business Administration degree in 1990 from The Citadel, graduating 9th out of his class of 516. He served four years as a Field Artillery Officer in the United States Army. He received a Juris Doctor in 1997 from the University of Georgia School of Law. In the summer of 1990 he was a laborer for his father's construction business and in 1996 he was a research assistant to professor Ronald D. Carlson at the University of Georgia School of Law. He engaged in the private practice of law for nine years at the Macon, Georgia law firm of Sell & Melton, LLP. Self was elected to the Georgia Superior Court from Macon in 2006, beginning service on January 1, 2007, and winning re-election in 2010 and 2014. He was chief judge from January 1, 2014, to January 1, 2017, with his tenure running from the retirement of his predecessor, S. Phillip Brown, to his elevation. On November 9, 2016, Governor Nathan Deal appointed Self to the Georgia Court of Appeals to the seat vacated by Michael P. Boggs, with his term beginning January 1, 2017. David L. Mincey III succeeded him, by appointment, on the Superior Court bench. He became the 83rd judge of the Court of Appeals and ended his tenure on the state bench after being confirmed to the United States District Court for the Middle District of Georgia.

Federal judicial service 

On July 13, 2017, President Donald Trump nominated Self to serve as a United States District Judge of the United States District Court for the Middle District of Georgia, to the seat vacated by Judge C. Ashley Royal, who assumed senior status on September 1, 2016. On October 4, 2017, a hearing on his nomination was held before the Senate Judiciary Committee. On October 26, 2017, his nomination was reported out of committee by a voice vote. On March 1, 2018, the United States Senate invoked cloture on his nomination by an 85–12 vote. On March 5, 2018, his nomination was confirmed by an 85–11 vote. He received his commission on March 7, 2018.

Notable cases

In February 2022, Self issued an injunction forbidding the Air Force from requiring an officer to be vaccinated against COVID-19, as against her religious objections. Responding to the Air Force's argument that vaccinations were necessary to promote military readiness, Self questioned the efficacy of the COVID vaccine, asking whether "a COVID-19 vaccine really provide more sufficient protection [than "natural immunity"]? This is especially curious given the number of people who have been and continue to be infected after becoming fully vaccinated and receiving a booster."

Memberships

He has been a member of the Federalist Society since 2008.

References

External links 
 
 

|-

|-

|-

1968 births
Living people
20th-century American lawyers
21st-century American lawyers
21st-century American judges
Federalist Society members
Georgia Court of Appeals judges
Georgia (U.S. state) lawyers
Georgia (U.S. state) state court judges
Judges of the United States District Court for the Middle District of Georgia
People from Macon, Georgia
Superior court judges in the United States
The Citadel, The Military College of South Carolina alumni
United States Army officers
United States district court judges appointed by Donald Trump
University of Georgia School of Law alumni